A Small Down Payment on Bliss is a 1929 German silent comedy film directed by Jaap Speyer and starring Dina Gralla, Paul Hörbiger, and Imre Ráday.

The film's art direction was by Willi Herrmann and Herbert O. Phillips.

Cast

References

External links 
 

1929 films
Films of the Weimar Republic
Films directed by Jaap Speyer
German silent feature films
German black-and-white films
German comedy films
1929 comedy films
Silent comedy films
1920s German films